Kurt Barber (born January 5, 1969) is the former head coach for Paducah Tilghman High School's football team and a former linebacker for the USC Trojans and in the National Football League.

High school career
Barber prepped at Paducah Tilghman High School where he won the Kentucky "Mr. Football" Award  in 1987. He was a high school All-American as both wide receiver and linebacker.

College career
Barber graduated with a BA in communications from the University of Southern California, where he was All-Pac-10 as a linebacker. He was a starter as a junior and senior and was a four-year letter winner.

Professional career
Barber was selected with the 42nd pick in the 2nd round of the 1992 NFL Draft by the New York Jets, where he played until 1995. He also played for the Denver Broncos and Chicago Bears.

Coaching career
Barber was originally named the UNLV Rebels football linebackers coach in 2004, after having coached at the University of Utah, Kent State and Tennessee-Martin. He began his coaching career in 1998 at Riverside Community College. He was the offensive line coach at Campbellsville University in Kentucky and was the former (2016–17) head coach at Paducah Tilghman High School.

References

1969 births
Living people
American football linebackers
New York Jets players
UNLV Rebels football coaches
USC Trojans football players
Utah Utes football coaches
Paducah Tilghman High School alumni
Sportspeople from Paducah, Kentucky
Players of American football from Kentucky